Cerbera dilatata (Chamorro: chi'ute) is a species of tree in the family Apocynaceae endemic to the Mariana Islands.

Description
This species has dark foliage and hairy flowers that are white and pinkish in the center. Its leaves are crowded near the ends of its branches. It has ovular fruit that are often coupled and speckled green.

Gallery

References

dilatata
Flora of the Mariana Islands